Gomphandra coriacea is a species of plant in the Stemonuraceae family. It is endemic to Sri Lanka.

References

External links
 http://indiabiodiversity.org/species/show/12666
 http://plants.jstor.org/specimen/s11-21096?history=true

coriacea
Endemic flora of Sri Lanka